Jemima Nicholas (also spelt Niclas; c. 1750 – July 1832), also known as Jemima Fawr, was a Welsh heroine during the 1797 Battle of Fishguard (commonly known as the last invasion of Britain).

Early life 
Jemima Nicholas was the daughter of William and Elinor Nicholas of Llanrhian, and was baptised in Mathry in 1755. She was a cobbler or a cobbler's wife.

The Battle of Fishguard 
In 1797, 1400 French troops, many of them drawn from prisons, sailed from Camaret and landed at  Llanwnda in Wales. Armed with a pitchfork, Nicholas led a group of women and rounded up twelve French soldiers who had been drinking, and held them captive inside a locked church overnight. The French surrendered shortly afterwards at the Royal Oak. She was awarded a lifetime pension for her efforts.

A Jemima Nicholas was also involved with rioting in Fishguard in 1824, though she was not convicted of any crime.

Legacy 
She died at the age of 82, in 1832. Her grave in Fishguard was marked with a plaque in 1897, on the occasion of the invasion's centennial. She is featured in the Last Invasion Tapestry commissioned by the Fishguard Arts Society for the 200th anniversary of the invasion. The 100 foot long tapestry is housed in its own gallery on the first floor of Fishguard Town Hall.  

In 2019, a hat said to have belonged to Jemima Nicholas sold by one of her brother's descendants at a charity auction, for £5000. The buyer was a distant relative who lived in Australia.  

The town of Fishguard had an official Jemima Nicholas re-enactor, Yvonne Fox, until her death in 2010; A new Jemima, Jacqui Scarr, was named in 2013. 

A children's book about Nicholas, Jemima Nicholas: Heroine of the Fishguard Invasion by Sian Lewis, was published in 2012, as part of a series on Welsh women's history.

Jemima Nicholas was included in the list of 100+ Welsh women who have made a significant contribution to Welsh life produced by WEN Wales.

References

 

1750 births
1832 deaths
1797 in Great Britain
Year of birth uncertain
People from Fishguard
People from Pembrokeshire
History of Pembrokeshire
19th-century Welsh people
18th-century Welsh people
18th-century Welsh women
19th-century Welsh women